Luís Tinoco is a Portuguese composer who has achieved renown for works including the operas Evil Machines (2008) and Paint Me (2010), and the cantata Wanderings of the Solitary Dreamer (2011). He was born in Portugal on 16 July 1969.

Career
Tinoco studied at the Escola Superior de Música de Lisboa, furthering his musical education at the Royal Academy of Music in London, and latterly at the University of York, where he completed his PhD in composition. From 2000 he has worked as a freelance composer. He also authors and produces new music radio programmes for Antena 2 / RTP.

Tinoco lectures at his alma mater, the Escola Superior de Música in Lisbon.

Compositions
Tinoco's compositions include the stage works Evil Machines (2008), a music theatre project with libretto and stage direction by the former Monty Python Terry Jones, and the chamber opera Paint Me (2010), the setting of a libretto by Stephen Plaice.

A cantata, Wanderings of the Solitary Dreamer (2011), uses text by Almeida Faria.

Orchestral works were commissioned by Radio France and the Seattle Symphony Orchestra.

Tinoco's music is published by the University of York Music Press.

Discography
A range of Tinoco's work including chamber music has been made available on several CDs. In June 2013 Naxos released a world première recording of four orchestral/vocal works: Round Time, From the Depth of Distance, Search Songs, and Songs From The Solitary Dreamer, performed by the Gulbenkian Orchestra under the baton of David Alan Miller, with sopranos Ana Quintans, Yeree Suh and Raquel Camarinha.

References
3. https://www.artway.pt/luistinoco?lang=en

21st-century composers
Portuguese composers
Portuguese male composers
1969 births
Living people
Place of birth missing (living people)
Alumni of the University of York
Alumni of the Royal Academy of Music
21st-century male musicians